Maurolicus australis, commonly known as the pennant pearlside, is a species of ray-finned fish in the genus Maurolicus. It lives in deep-water marine environments off New Zealand and Southern Australia. It has 33-34 vertebrae.

References

Sternoptychidae
Taxa named by James Hector